Alan Emrich is best known as a writer about and designer of video games, who coined the term "4X", contributed to the design of Master of Orion and Master of Orion 3, and wrote strategy guides for video games. Before the rise of video games, Emrich wrote about and designed board games and organized conventions about them. He currently runs a small game publishing company and lectures in game design and project management. In 2001 Emrich received the Blomgren / Hamilton Memorial Award for Lifetime Achievement from ConsimWorld.COM.

4X games

Emrich coined the term "4X" ("eXplore, eXpand, eXploit, eXterminate") in his 1993 review of Master of Orion in Computer Gaming World, describing strategy games that involve exploration, expansion, and exploitation of territory, and extermination of opponents.  The design of Master of Orion includes several suggestions he and Tom Hughes made.

Until April 2002 Emrich was a lead designer of Master of Orion 3, which attempted to add a 5th X, eXperience, to the genre. Then he left the developer, Quicksilver Software, for reasons neither party wished to explain.

Strategy guides
Emrich wrote or co-wrote the following strategy guides:
Sid Meier’s Civilization or Rome on 640K a Day (with Johnny L. Wilson)
Official Strategy Guide for Master of Orion (with Tom Hughes)
Official Strategy Guide for Master of Magic (with Tom Hughes and Petra Schlunk)
Official Strategy Guide for Empire Deluxe

He has severely criticized recent strategy guides for:
containing only facts which should have been in the game manual, e.g. about the user interface.
failing to teach users how to improve their play.
failing to provide information which helps them to makes decisions, e.g. about the capabilities and costs of units and buildings.
being inaccurate, often because the developers have tweaked the game during the publication lead time.

The faults, he says, are mainly caused by the game publishers' and guide publishers' haste to get their products on to the market.

Brief career history
In 1977 Emrich and John Meyers co-founded the ORCCON game convention in Los Angeles, and later Emrich helped in the start-up of the GATEWAY and GAMEX conventions, also in Los Angeles. Emrich was the first Vice-President of the Game Manufacturers Association. In the 1980s he founded a game company Diverse Talents Inc., which imported and exported games, ran the Los Angeles game conventions, and published several magazines including Fire & Movement. In this period he also designed some board and card games.

He was a five-time undefeated champion on the game show Whew! in July and August 1979, winning $5840 but never winning the $25,000 bonus round.

During the 1990s Emrich worked for Computer Gaming World magazine as its first Strategy Game Editor and later its first Online Editor. In this period he also wrote or co-wrote the strategy guides listed above. Until April 2002 he was a lead designer of Master of Orion 3.

In 2001 Emrich received the Blomgren / Hamilton Memorial Award for Lifetime Achievement from ConsimWorld.COM.

He is formerly a professor at the Art Institute of California: Orange County, where he taught Game Design, Prototyping, and Project Management to the next generation of game makers — he regards this as an official instance of his lifelong passion for teaching. He also co-founded and owns Victory Point Games, a board and card game publishing company that was launched to produce small, budget-priced games based around submissions from students and professional game designers alike — in fact he founded the company in order to give his students experience of the business side of game publishing.

References

External links
The Alan Emrich Home Page
Victory Point Games

Year of birth missing (living people)
Living people
American video game designers